Nicolas Claire  (born 10 July 1987) is a French handball player for Pays d'Aix UCH and the French national team.

He was part of the French team that won the bronze medal at the 2018 European Men's Handball Championship.

References

External links

1987 births
Living people
French male handball players
Sportspeople from Saint-Denis, Réunion
Competitors at the 2009 Mediterranean Games
Mediterranean Games silver medalists for France
Mediterranean Games medalists in handball